Stenoterommata crassistyla is a species of mygalomorph spiders of Argentina, named after its wide embolus (stylus) in males, distinguishing this species from the sympatric S. tenuistyla. Its behaviour is similar to the latter species as well. Females are distinguished from other Stenoterommata having multireceptaculate spermathecae by the presence of inferior tarsal claws on the anterior legs. Males have the palpal tibia with a basal notch at either side of the base, and swollen. The species is distinguished from S. tenuistyla by lacking the short spines on the male metatarsus I, characteristic of said species.

Description
Male: total length ; cephalothorax length , width ; cephalic region length , width ; labium length , width ; sternum length , width . Its labium possesses no cuspules. Its sternal sigilla is small, shallow and oval, with its sternum rebordered. Chelicerae: its rastellum is weak, with long, attenuate setae. Cheliceral tumescence is present, with few hairs on its inferior half. Its cephalothorax is reddish brown with golden hairs, while its abdomen is yellowish brown with dark mottles forming.
Female: total length ; cephalothorax length , width ; cephalic region length , width ; fovea width ; labium length , width ; sternum length , width . Its cephalic region is convex, with the fovea procurved. Its labium has no cuspules, while its sternal sigilla is small, oval and shallow, with its sternum rebordered. Chelicerae: its rastellum is formed by thick, long setae. Color as in male.

Distribution
Uruguay and Argentina Entre Ríos and northern Buenos Aires Province. The species sometimes coexists with S. tenuistyla.

See also
Spider anatomy

References

External links
ZipcodeZoo entry

Pycnothelidae
Spiders of Argentina
Spiders described in 1995